The Washington Wizards (formerly known as the Chicago Packers, the Chicago Zephyrs, the Baltimore Bullets, the Capital Bullets, and the Washington Bullets) have selected the following players in the National Basketball Association Draft.

Key

As Washington Wizards (1997–present)

As Washington Bullets (1974–1996)

As Capital Bullets (1973)

As Baltimore Bullets (1963–1972)

As Chicago Zephyrs (1962)

As Chicago Packers (1961)

References
 

 
National Basketball Association draft
Draft history